This is a list of 157 species in Ptycta, a genus of common barklice in the family Psocidae.

Ptycta species

 Ptycta aaroni Thornton, 1984 c g
 Ptycta afasciata Endang, Thornton & New, 2002 c g
 Ptycta anacantha Badonnel, 1967 c g
 Ptycta angulata Thornton, S. S. Lee & Chui, 1972 c g
 Ptycta angustifrons (Enderlein, 1931) c g
 Ptycta apicalis Broadhead & Alison Richards, 1980 c g
 Ptycta apicantha Thornton, 1984 c g
 Ptycta apicanthoides Thornton, 1984 c g
 Ptycta arandae Baz, 1990 c g
 Ptycta aschekei Turner, B. D., 1976 c g
 Ptycta australis Schmidt, E. R. & Thornton, 1993 c g
 Ptycta badonneli (Roesler, 1943) c g
 Ptycta bebea Thornton, 1981 c g
 Ptycta biloba Smithers, Courtenay, 1999 c g
 Ptycta blanci Badonnel, 1976 c g
 Ptycta breuschi Smithers, Courtenay & Thornton, 1990 c g
 Ptycta buettikeri Badonnel, 1982 c g
 Ptycta bulbosa Badonnel, 1969 c g
 Ptycta caboverdensis Meinander, 1966 c g
 Ptycta campbelli Schmidt, E. R. & Thornton, 1993 c g
 Ptycta chekei Turner, B. D., 1976 c g
 Ptycta cogani New, 1977 c g
 Ptycta colei Schmidt, E. R. & New, 2008 c g
 Ptycta cruciata Badonnel, 1979 c g
 Ptycta curvata Li, Fasheng, 2002 c g
 Ptycta curviclava Broadhead & Alison Richards, 1980 c g
 Ptycta deltoides Li, Fasheng, 1992 c g
 Ptycta descarpentriesi Badonnel, 1976 c g
 Ptycta diacantha Thornton, 1984 c g
 Ptycta diadela Thornton, 1984 c g
 Ptycta diastema Thornton, 1984 c g
 Ptycta dichotoma Broadhead & Alison Richards, 1980 c g
 Ptycta dicrosa Thornton, 1984 c g
 Ptycta disclera Thornton, 1984 c g
 Ptycta distincta Smithers, Courtenay & Thornton, 1990 c g
 Ptycta distinguenda (Perkins, 1899) c g
 Ptycta drepana Thornton, 1984 c g
 Ptycta elegantula Li, Fasheng, 1999 c g
 Ptycta elena New & Thornton, 1975 c g
 Ptycta emarginata New, 1974 c g
 Ptycta enderleini (Roesler, 1943) c g
 Ptycta episcia Thornton, 1984 c g
 Ptycta flavipalpi Li, Fasheng & Chikun Yang, 1987 c g
 Ptycta floresensis Endang, Thornton & New, 2002 c g
 Ptycta frayorgensis New & Thornton, 1981 c g
 Ptycta freycineti Schmidt, E. R. & New, 2008 c g
 Ptycta frogneri Thornton, 1984 c g
 Ptycta frontalis Thornton, 1984 c g
 Ptycta furcata Li, Fasheng, 1993 c g
 Ptycta giffardi Thornton, 1984 c g
 Ptycta glossoptera New, 1974 c g
 Ptycta grucheti Turner, B. D., 1976 c g
 Ptycta gynegonia Thornton, 1984 c g
 Ptycta gyroflexa Li, Fasheng, 2001 c g
 Ptycta haleakalae (Perkins, 1899) c g
 Ptycta hardyi Thornton, 1984 c g
 Ptycta hawaiiensis Thornton, 1984 c g
 Ptycta heterogamias (Perkins, 1899) c g
 Ptycta hollowayae Smithers, Courtenay, 1984 c g
 Ptycta iaoensis Thornton, 1984 c g
 Ptycta improcera New, 1974 c g
 Ptycta incerta Smithers, Courtenay & Thornton, 1990 c g
 Ptycta incurvata Thornton, 1960 c g
 Ptycta isabelae Smithers, Courtenay & Thornton, 1990 c g
 Ptycta johnsoni Bess, E. C. & Yoshizawa, 2007 c g
 Ptycta kaala Thornton, 1984 c g
 Ptycta kauaiensis (Perkins, 1899) c g
 Ptycta kenyensis New, 1975 c g
 Ptycta kiboschoensis (Enderlein, 1907) c g
 Ptycta krakatau Cole, New & Thornton, 1989 c g
 Ptycta laevidorsum (Enderlein, 1931) c g
 Ptycta lanaiensis (Perkins, 1899) c g
 Ptycta lemniscata (Smithers, Courtenay, 1964) c g
 Ptycta leucothorax Thornton, 1984 c g
 Ptycta lineata Mockford, 1974 i c g
 Ptycta lobata (Badonnel, 1955) c g
 Ptycta lobophora Thornton, 1984 i c g
 Ptycta longicaulis Li, Fasheng, 1992 c g
 Ptycta longipennis Smithers, Courtenay, 1984 c g
 Ptycta longispinosa (Smithers, Courtenay, 1964) c g
 Ptycta lugosensis Smithers, Courtenay & Thornton, 1990 c g
 Ptycta lunulata New, 1972 c g
 Ptycta maculata Thornton, S. S. Lee & Chui, 1972 c g
 Ptycta maculifrons Thornton, 1984 c g
 Ptycta maculosa Badonnel, 1967 c g
 Ptycta marianensis Thornton, S. S. Lee & Chui, 1972 c g
 Ptycta marta Thornton & A. K. T. Woo, 1973 c g
 Ptycta merapiensis Endang, Thornton & New, 2002 c g
 Ptycta microctena Thornton, 1984 c g
 Ptycta microglena Thornton, 1984 c g
 Ptycta micromaculata Thornton, S. S. Lee & Chui, 1972 c g
 Ptycta molokaiensis (Perkins, 1899) c g
 Ptycta monticola (Perkins, 1899) c g
 Ptycta muogamarra Smithers, Courtenay, 1977 c g
 Ptycta nadleri Galil, 1981 c g
 Ptycta nitens Thornton, S. S. Lee & Chui, 1972 c g
 Ptycta novohibernica Smithers, Courtenay & Thornton, 1990 c g
 Ptycta oahuensis (Perkins, 1899) c g
 Ptycta obscura Broadhead & Alison Richards, 1980 c g
 Ptycta oceanica New, 1977 c g
 Ptycta oligocantha Thornton, 1984 c g
 Ptycta palikea Thornton, 1984 c g
 Ptycta pallawahensis Schmidt, E. R. & New, 2008 c g
 Ptycta pallida Badonnel, 1967 c g
 Ptycta paralobata New, 1975 c g
 Ptycta pardena Thornton, 1984 c g
 Ptycta parvidentata Tsutsumi, 1964 c g
 Ptycta parvula Thornton, S. S. Lee & Chui, 1972 c g
 Ptycta pauliani Badonnel, 1967 c g
 Ptycta pearmani New, 1972 c g
 Ptycta pedina Thornton, 1984 c g
 Ptycta peleae Thornton, 1984 c g
 Ptycta perkinsi Thornton, 1984 c g
 Ptycta persimilis Thornton, 1984 c g
 Ptycta picta New, 1974 c g
 Ptycta pikeloi Thornton, 1984 c g
 Ptycta pitallo Endang, Thornton & New, 2002 c g
 Ptycta placophora Thornton, 1984 c g
 Ptycta platyclava Broadhead & Alison Richards, 1980 c g
 Ptycta polluta (Walsh, 1862) i c g b
 Ptycta polyacantha Badonnel, 1967 c g
 Ptycta precincta Thornton, 1984 c g
 Ptycta prosta Schmidt, E. R. & Thornton, 1993 c g
 Ptycta pulchra Turner, B. D., 1976 c g
 Ptycta pupukea Thornton, 1984 c g
 Ptycta quadrimaculata (Smithers, Courtenay, 1964) c g
 Ptycta recava Bess, E. C. & Yoshizawa, 2007 c g
 Ptycta reticulata New, 1972 c g
 Ptycta revoluta Li, Fasheng, 2002 c g
 Ptycta rhina Thornton, 1984 c g
 Ptycta sardjani Endang & Thornton, 1992 c g
 Ptycta schillei (Enderlein, 1906) c g
 Ptycta schisma Thornton, 1984 c g
 Ptycta schneideri Badonnel, 1981 c g
 Ptycta serrata Endang, Thornton & New, 2002 c g
 Ptycta seyrigi (Badonnel, 1935) c g
 Ptycta simulator (Perkins, 1899) c g
 Ptycta stena Thornton, 1984 c g
 Ptycta stenomedia Thornton, 1984 c g
 Ptycta striatoptera New, 1975 c g
 Ptycta swezeyi Thornton, 1984 c g
 Ptycta sylvestris (Perkins, 1899) c g
 Ptycta tachardiae Badonnel, 1967 c g
 Ptycta tapensis Endang, Thornton & New, 2002 c g
 Ptycta telma Thornton, 1984 c g
 Ptycta tikala (Mockford, 1957) c g
 Ptycta timorensis Endang, Thornton & New, 2002 c g
 Ptycta trullifera Smithers, Courtenay, 1998 c g
 Ptycta tsutsumii New & Thornton, 1976 c g
 Ptycta umbrata New, 1974 c g
 Ptycta unica (Perkins, 1899) c g
 Ptycta vaga New, 1975 c g
 Ptycta verticalis Vaughan, Thornton & New, 1991 c g
 Ptycta vittipennis (Perkins, 1899) c g
 Ptycta williamsorum Smithers, Courtenay, 1997 c g
 Ptycta ypsilon Broadhead & Alison Richards, 1980 c g
 Ptycta zimmermani Thornton, 1984 c g

Data sources: i = ITIS, c = Catalogue of Life, g = GBIF, b = Bugguide.net

References

Ptycta
Articles created by Qbugbot